The Kerry Intermediate Hurling Championship is an annual hurling competition contested by mid-tier Kerry GAA clubs.

Kilgarvan are the title holders (2022). Extra-time can be used to determine the winners of games.

Honours
The winners play in the Munster Junior Club Hurling Championship, such as Kilgarvan in 2018, and if successful there, can represent the province in the All-Ireland Junior Club Hurling Championship. Unlike in other counties, the winning team is not automatically promoted to the senior grade after winning. Since Kerry has very few hurling clubs, many of the competing teams are second teams of clubs competing in the Kerry Senior Hurling Championship. Kilmoyley were also one of the current Munster finalists which they were in January 2022. They won that game to become the first Kerry club to a Munster intermediate title. They went on to the All-Ireland Intermediate Club Hurling Championship final at Croke Park.

Roll of honour

References

External links
Details of Kerry champions 1998–2007

2
Intermediate hurling county championships